The 1990–91 Missouri Tigers men's basketball team represented the University of Missouri as a member of the Big Eight Conference during the 1990–91 NCAA men's basketball season. Led by head coach Norm Stewart, the Tigers won the Big Eight tournament title. Ineligible to participate in the NCAA Tournament, the Tigers finished with an overall record of 20–10 (8–6 Big Eight).

Roster

Schedule and results

 
|-
!colspan=9| Regular season

|-
!colspan=9| Big Eight Conference tournament

Rankings

Awards
Doug Smith – Big Eight Player of the Year, All-American

References

Missouri
Missouri Tigers men's basketball seasons